William Stephen Tribell (born August 15, 1977) is an American poet. His work has appeared in a number of anthologies, magazines and journals and online under the pseudonyms  Walton S. Tissot, and Wilbur S. Tell. Many of his poems have been recorded, spoken word and with instrumentation, most notably by John Blyth Barrymore and Gary Burbank.

Early life
Tribell was born in Frankfort, Kentucky and grew up a few miles from the small town of Burgin and the first settlement in Kentucky, Harrodsburg.

Life in Louisiana and Europe
A long-time resident of the French Quarter, New Orleans, Louisiana, he witnessed Hurricane Katrina in 2005, and its aftermath. In 2008, he participated in the presidential election as Louisiana State Director for U.S. Senator Mike Gravel. He has traveled extensively settling in Europe in the spring of 2009. Tribell currently lives and writes in Budapest, Hungary.

Sources
 Accents Radio Show WRFL 88.1 FM April 29, 2011
 Dead Beats Literary Blog August 2, 2011
 Peripheral Surveys 4th Edition - Marginalia  feature August 2011
 Post It Poetry August 2011
 MENSA's Calliope issue #130 Winter 2011
 MENSA's Calliope issue #126 Winter 2010
 Cowboys & Indians Magazine  April 27, 2010
 Outsiders Writers Collective Poetry for the Lost Souls issue #4 November 2009
 Terracotta Typewriter issue #3 oct 2009

References

External links
 

1977 births
Living people
People from Frankfort, Kentucky
21st-century American poets